Chuvash State Agrarian University is a higher educational institution located in the central part of the city of Cheboksary (Chuvash Republic). The full name of the university since April 2020 is the Federal State Budgetary Educational Institution of Higher Education "Chuvash State Agrarian University" (in 1995-2020-CSAU, formerly CSAI).

Faculties 
 biotechnology and agronomy;
 veterinary medicine and animal science;
 engineering;
 economic.
In April 2014, the Center for Additional Professional Education was established on the basis of the Faculty of Advanced Training and Retraining of Personnel.

History 

The Agricultural Academy opened on September 1, 1931. Students were trained in difficult conditions. There were not enough textbooks, exhibits, medicines, classrooms, and qualified teachers. In 1939 and 1940, the institute's staff participated in the All-Union Agricultural Exhibition. In 1941, it was called the Chuvash Agricultural Institute, was a university of the People's Commissariat of Agriculture of the USSR and had a postal address: Cheboksary, Leningradskaya Street, house number 19. The Great Patriotic War required a radical restructuring of the entire work of the institute. The school building and dormitories were transferred to the evacuated weaving factory. Classes were held in unsuitable premises, in schools in the second and third shifts. Many teachers and staff of the Institute went to the front.

In 1970, the preparatory department was opened, which played an important role in raising the general educational level of working and rural youth entering the institute. So, in September 1994, the specialty "Technology of agricultural production"was opened. In the same year, training in the specialty "Mechanization of processing of agricultural products" began. The agriculture of the republic was in dire need of specialists in veterinary medicine. Based on this need, in September 1997, the specialty "Veterinary Medicine"was opened. In 1998, the training of personnel in the specialty "Cars and automotive industry" began.

At the end of the 90s, new departments were opened at the university for the training of veterinary doctors and the corresponding laboratories were equipped (Academic Building No. 3 on per. Berry). In 2001, a new training building for personnel training in the specialty "Cars and Automotive Industry" was put into operation. On September 1, 2009, the new academic building of the Faculty of Engineering was opened.

The university received the status of an academy in 1995, and the status of a university - in 2020.

See also 
 Chuvash State Pedagogical University
 Chuvash State University
 Chuvash State Academic Song and Dance Ensemble
 Chuvash State Symphony Capella

References

External links 
 Official website

Universities in Volga Region
Buildings and structures in Chuvashia
Cheboksary
Agricultural universities and colleges in Russia
Organizations based in Chuvashia